Acacia diaphana is a shrub belonging to the genus Acacia and the subgenus Phyllodineae. It is native to an area in the Goldfields-Esperance region of Western Australia.

See also
List of Acacia species

References

diaphana
Acacias of Western Australia
Taxa named by Bruce Maslin